Małachowo-Szemborowice  is a village in the administrative district of Gmina Witkowo, within Gniezno County, Greater Poland Voivodeship, in west-central Poland.

Małachowo-Szemborowice, historically also known as Małachowo-Samborowice, was a private village of Polish nobility, administratively located in the Gniezno County in the Kalisz Voivodeship in the Greater Poland Province of the Polish Crown.

References

Villages in Gniezno County